The Sykia Dam is a mostly constructed but unused earth-filled embankment dam on the Acheloos River along the border of Karditsa and Arta, Greece.

The idea for the Sykia Dam and overall diversion project was first envisioned in the 1930s but a lack of funding precluded construction. Interest in the project was revived in 1984 and construction on the dam began in 1996. Over the next several years there was a series of legal battles that led to final construction stalling, most recently in 2005. Opponents of the scheme cite significant changes to the environment, flooding of villages and that the scheme will divert  of water annually from the Acheloss. Supporters call on the benefit to the lucrative cotton crops it will help irrigate and the dam's planned 120 MW hydroelectric power plant.

See also

 Energy in Greece
 Renewable energy in Greece

References

Dams in Greece
Hydroelectric power stations in Greece
Earth-filled dams
Interbasin transfer
Dams on the Achelous River
Buildings and structures in Karditsa (regional unit)
Buildings and structures in Arta (regional unit)
Dam controversies